The Greatest Hits is a greatest hits album by American  band 3 Doors Down. It was released on November 19, 2012, via Republic Records. The album features nine number-one hits that have been remixed and re-mastered, alongside three new songs, "One Light", "There's a Life", and "Goodbyes". The three new songs are the first new releases with Chet Roberts on guitar.

The album peaked at number 94 on the US Billboard 200, number 7 on Hard Rock Albums chart, and number 13 on Alternative Albums chart.

Track listing

Personnel

 Brad Arnold – Lead vocals, drums (tracks 1,6,7,9)
 Todd Harrell – Bass
 Chris Henderson – Rhythm guitar
 Greg Upchurch – Drums (tracks 4,10-12)
 Matt Roberts – Lead guitar, backing vocals
 Daniel Adair – Drums (track 5)
 Josh Freese – Drums (tracks 2,3,8)

Production
 Jack Joseph Puig – Remixing
 Ted Jensen – Remastering

References

External links
Official website
Record Label website

2012 greatest hits albums
3 Doors Down albums
Republic Records compilation albums